Savignia birostra is a species of sheet weaver found in Russia and Alaska. It was described by Chamberlin & Ivie in 1947.

References

Linyphiidae
Spiders described in 1947
Spiders of Russia